Olimpiu Di Luppi (born Urcan, 1977) is a historian and author. Of Italian and Turkish heritage, he is a Permanent Resident in Singapore since 2002, where he works as a consultant on advanced research in Arts and Humanities. He is a long-time contributor to Edward Winter's Chess Notes.

The Capablanca Project
On June 26, 2021, Di Luppi announced in Chess Notes the "Capablanca Project,"  which comprises a scholarly pictorial biography, a graphic novel and a documentary. According to his project's website, "In addition to a comprehensive chronicle, the aim is to salvage, restore and preserve material related to the Cuban marvel."

Bibliography 
Surviving Changi: E.E. Colman - A Chess Biography, Singapore Heritage Society, 2007. 
Adolf Albin in America: A European Chess Master's Sojourn, 1893-1895, McFarland, 2008. 
Julius Finn: A Chess Master's Life In America, 1871-1931, McFarland, 2010. 
Arthur Kaufmann: A Chess Biography, 1872-1938, McFarland, 2012 (with Peter Michael Braunwarth). 
Singapore Chess: A History, 1945-1990, World Scientific, 2017 (with Shashi Jayakumar). 
W.H.K. Pollock: A Chess Biography with 523 Games, McFarland, 2017 (with John S. Hilbert).

References

External links
 McFarland Books by Olimpiu Di Luppi
Olimpiu  Di Luppi's Twitter webpage
The Capablanca Project

1977 births
Living people
Singaporean historians
Chess historians
Chess writers